Barta Barri (16 August 1911 – 7 December 2003) was a Hungarian-born Spanish film actor.

Selected filmography

 The Vila Family (1950)
 Criminal Brigade (1950) - Mario
 Verónica (1950)
 Spanish Serenade (1952) - Jefe de los saboteadores
 Dulce nombre (1952)
 Almas en peligro (1952)
 Persecution in Madrid (1952) - Pacheco
 The Dance of the Heart (1953) - Don Pablo
 Bronce y luna (1953)
 La montaña sin ley (1953)
 Fantasía española (1953) - Toscanelli
 El presidio (1954) - Pedro Ramírez
 The Louts (1954)
 Sor Angélica (1954)
 One Bullet Is Enough (1954) - Patorni
 El ceniciento (1955) - Clara's father
 Los agentes del quinto grupo (1955) - Barrier
 El indiano (1955)
 El golfo que vio una estrella (1955)
 El puente del diablo (1956) - Inspector
 Ha pasado un hombre (1956) - Valdés
 La pecadora (1956) - Francisco, el alcalde
 Sitiados en la ciudad (1957)
 Whom God Forgives (1957) - Capataz
 The Pride and the Passion (1957) - (uncredited)
 El aventurero (1957) - Emil
 ...Y eligió el infierno (1957)
 La guerra empieza en Cuba (1957) - Coronel
 The Sun Comes Out Every Day (1958) - Pelotti
 Muchachas en vacaciones (1958)
 El puente de la paz (1958)
 Red Cross Girls (1958) - Padre de Marion
 Die Sklavenkarawane (1958) - Scheich el Dschemal
 Las de Caín (1959)
 Una Gran señora (1959) - Duque de Rípoli
 Der Löwe von Babylon (1959) - Pädar (uncredited)
 Listen To My Song (1959) - Isabel
 Ama Rosa (1960) - Traficante
 The Boy Who Stole a Million (1960) - Gang Leader
 Peaches in Syrup (1960)
 Conqueror of Maracaibo (1961) - Wilson
 The Invincible Gladiator (1961) - Gladiator
 Darling (1961) - Revolutionary Leader
 The Happy Thieves (1961) - Chern - Lawyer / Fence (uncredited)
 Frei Escova (1961)
 Mi adorable esclava (1962) - Comprador de la lámpara
 The Son of Captain Blood (1962) - Kirby
 Gladiators 7 (1962) - Flaccus
 Siempre en mi recuerdo (1962)
 Duello nel Texas (1963) - Lou Stedman
 The Secret Seven (1963) - Baxo
 The Ceremony (1963) - Death house guard
 José María (1963)
 Cyrano and d'Artagnan (1964) - Tréville (uncredited)
 Tintin and the Blue Oranges (1964) - L'émir (uncredited)
 Saul e David (1964)
 La carga de la policía montada (1964) - Trapper Don Halsey
 Son of a Gunfighter (1965) - Esteban - Don Pedro's Major Domo
 That Man in Istanbul (1965) - Captain
 Espionage in Tangier (1965) - French chauffeur
 I grandi condottieri (1965) - Fara
 La dama del alba (1966) - Carretero
 Lightning Bolt (1966) - Senator Woolner
 The Drums of Tabu (1966) - Barta
 Black Box Affair (1966)
 The Big Gundown (1966) - Nathan Plummer - Old Outlaw (uncredited)
 Savage Pampas (1966) - Priest (uncredited)
 Joe l'implacabile (1967) - Cigno
 I'll Kill Him and Return Alone (1967) - Rancher - Tunstill's Neighbor
 Left Handed Johnny West (1967) - Sheriff
 Las cicatrices (1967) - Mayoral
 Custer of the West (1967) - Grand Duke Alexi
 ¡Cómo sois las mujeres! (1968)
 La esclava del paraíso (1968) - Ahmed
 Dead Men Don't Count (1968) - Forrest
 White Comanche (1968) - Mayor Bolker
 O.K. Yevtushenko (1968) - Col. Yevtushenko
 Prisionero en la ciudad (1969) - Chantajista
 Kiss Me Monster (1969) - Inspektor Kramer
 Bridge over the Elbe (1969)
 Garringo (1969)
 Simón Bolívar (1969)
 Cry Chicago (1969) - Matón, O'Connor's henchman
 A Candidate for a Killing (1969) - Hombre de los gémelos
 El niño y el potro (Más allá de río Miño) (1969) - Maracoli
 Los hombres las prefieren viudas (1970) - (uncredited)
 Mr. Superinvisible (1970)
 A Man Called Sledge (1970)
 Cannon for Cordoba (1970) - (uncredited)
 Growing Leg, Diminishing Skirt (1970)
 El vértigo del crimen (1970) - Mr. Fred
 El vampiro de la autopista (1971) - Comisario
 Goya, a Story of Solitude (1971)
 La Noche de Walpurgis (1971) - Muller
 Un aller simple (1971) - Berck
 El Hombre que Vino del Odio (1971) - Vittorio
 Si estás muerto, ¿por qué bailas? (1971) - Divilow
 Red Sun (1971) - Paco
 Nicholas and Alexandra - (uncredited)
 Bad Man's River (1971)
 Dr. Jekyll y el Hombre Lobo (1972) - Gyogyo, the inn-keeper
 Horror Express (1972) - First Telegraphist
 Treasure Island (1972) - Redruth
 Pancho Villa (1972) - Alfonso
 Experiencia prematrimonial (1972) - Jorge
 Huyendo del halcón (1973)
 The Man Called Noon (1973) - Mexican
 ..e così divennero i 3 supermen del West (1973) - Saloon Owner (uncredited)
 Pugni, pirati e karatè (1973) - Pirate (uncredited)
 Tarot (1973) - Pastor
 Las violentas (1974) - Howard
 El talón de Aquiles (1974)
 El pez de los ojos de oro (1974) - Comisario
 El kárate, el Colt y el impostor (1974) - Sheriff (uncredited)
 Night of the Walking Dead (1975) - Mijai
 Ligeramente viudas (1976)
 Un día con Sergio (1976) - Maitre
 The People Who Own the Dark (1976) - Russian ambassador
 The Second Power (1976) - Doctor Daza
 La menor (1976)
 Where Time Began (1977) - Professor
 Curse of the Black Cat (1977) - Cronometrador
 The Black Pearl (1977) - Luis
 Fantasma en el Oeste (1978)
 From Hell to Victory (1979) - (uncredited)
 El lobo negro (1981)
 Revenge of the Black Wolf (1981) - Geronimo
 Monster Dog (1984) - Old Man
 The Sea Serpent (1985) - Defensor
 Las tribulaciones de un Buda Bizco (1986) - (final film role)

References

Bibliography 
 Pitts, Michael R. Western Movies: A Guide to 5,105 Feature Films. McFarland, 2012.

External links 
 

1911 births
2003 deaths
Hungarian emigrants to Spain
Hungarian male film actors
Spanish male film actors
Male actors from Budapest